The Twofold Bay and Maneroo Observer, was an English language newspaper, issued twice weekly, and published in Eden, New South Wales, Australia.

History 
The first edition of the paper was issued Friday . The newspaper was published by J.R. Edwards in competition to Eden's weekly paper, the Twofold Bay and Maneroo Telegraph.

Digitisation 
The Twofold Bay and Maneroo Observer has been digitised as part of the Australian Newspapers Digitisation Program of the National Library of Australia.

See also 
 List of newspapers in New South Wales

References

External links 
 

Defunct newspapers published in New South Wales